Native trees in Toronto are trees that are naturally growing in Toronto and were not later introduced by humans. The area that presently comprise Toronto is a part of the Carolinian forest, although agricultural and urban developments destroyed significant portions of that life zone. In addition, many of Toronto's native trees have been displaced by non-native plants and trees introduced by settlers from Europe and Asia from the 18th century to the present. Most of the native trees are found in the Toronto ravine system, parks, and along the Toronto waterway system.

The type of trees growing across the city varies based on the soil condition in the area. Tree cover in the city prior to European settlement started from the shore line back. Settlement resulted in trees being cut for use in building homes and ships and for heating by early residents. The current tree cover (or canopy) in Toronto is estimated to be between 26.6 and 28% and many trees are not native to the city. The city's Urban Forestry Services plants these trees on city property and encourages others in the city to do the same.

A partial list of native trees in Toronto:

Ash
Black ash
Green ash
White ash
Aspen
Balsam poplar
Large-tooth aspen
Trembling aspen
Basswood
American basswood
Birch
White birch
Yellow birch
Beech
North American beech
Cedar
Northern white cedar
Chestnut
American chestnut
Dogwoods
Alternate-leaved dogwood
Elm
White elm
Hackberry
Northern hackberry
Hawthorns
Hickory
Bittnut hickory
Shagbark hickory
Hemlock
Eastern hemlock
Hop-hornbeam
Ironwood
Hornbeam
Blue-beech
Larch
Tamarack
Maple
Red maple
Silver maple
Striped maple
Sugar maple
Mountain-ash
American mountain-ash
Mulberry
Red mulberry
Oak
Bur oak
Eastern black oak
Northern red oak
Pin oak
Swamp white oak
White oak
Pine
Eastern white pine
Sycamores 
Buttonwood
Prunus
Black cherry
Chokecherry
Pin cherry
Sassafras
White sassafras
Serviceberries
Walnut
Butternut
Black walnut
Willow
Black willow
Peachleaf willow

See also

 Fauna of Toronto
 Oak Ridges Moraine

References

External links
 Tree Planting
 About Leaf

Trees of Ontario
Environment of Toronto